Furtwangen im Schwarzwald (Low Alemannic: Furtwange im Schwarzwald) is a small city located in the Black Forest region of southwestern Germany. Together with Villingen-Schwenningen, Furtwangen is part of the district (German: Kreis) of Schwarzwald-Baar.

Geography 
Furtwangen is located in the Southern Black Forest Nature Park in the Southeastern Black Forest, around 25 kilometers west of the district town of Villingen-Schwenningen and around 27 kilometers northeast of Freiburg. 

Furtwangen is the highest town in Baden-Württemberg. Between 850 m and 1,150 m above sea level, it lies in the upper Bregtal of the Central Black Forest in the headwaters of the Danube. The Breg is a small stream which, coming from the mountainous areas around Furtwangen, flows down through the inner city to the east. The Breg is one of the two little rivers which unite to form the river Danube.

The population of Furtwangen comprises around 10,000 inhabitants (as of 2016/17).

History 
Furtwangen gained the right to call itself a city in 1873. It was not the first time that Furtwangen applied for city rights. After all, in 1833, the village already had 2,292 inhabitants and 2,470 in 1840. The previous attempts had always failed because Furtwangen had no town hall, although higher administrative levels had already warned the building several times.

Coat of arms 
The coat of arms is mainly in silver. It depicts a red castle ruin on green ground with silver openings, surrounded by two green fir trees.

Clockmaking 
Furtwangen owes its economic boom to the clock, which reached the Black Forest in the 17th century and brought the region an unexpected boom in the 18th century. The founding of the watchmaking school in 1850 was the expression and motor of this development. Its first rector Robert Gerwig also achieved fame as one of the builders of the Black Forest Railway. The trade association, to which the city also owes the establishment of the Sparkasse, gave the impetus to establish the watchmaking school. Today's Furtwangen University of Applied Sciences developed from the watchmaking school.

After the city elevation in 1873, industrialization began in Furtwangen through the watch industry. Large companies such as Baduf, Furtwängler and Siedle emerged. In total, they provided 2,000 jobs. At the turn of the century, the Furtwang industry was at its peak. The traffic conditions were improved by the Bregtalbahn, which opened in 1893.

Emilian Wehrle (1832–1896) made musical clocks in the Furtwangen-Schönenbach area from about 1857 until his death in 1896. These musical clocks included the Trumpeter clock, Flute clock, Singing Bird Clock, and Rooster Clock. These clocks call the hour with the sound of the trumpet, flute, song bird and rooster respectively.

Culture and tourism 
The German Clock Museum exhibits more than 8,000 items related to clocks and clockmaking. The museum's history dates back to 1852, when Robert Gerwig, Director of the Grand Ducal Baden Clockmaking School in Furtwangen, began to collect old clocks as witnesses of traditional handicrafts. In 1978, the "Historic Clock Collection" is renamed into the "German Clock Museum".

The Hexenloch Mill was built in 1825. It has been in the family since 1839. The mill was built as a sawmill, its wheels are driven by the water from the hay stream (approx. 300 litres/second). The large water wheel (4m diameter, 13 HP) is the drive of a high-speed and a circular saw which are still functional today.

Education 
The University of Applied Sciences Furtwangen was founded in 1850. It specialises in microelectronics, precision mechanics, computer sciences, informatics, digital media, industrial technologies, medical and life sciences, mechanical and medical engineering etc.

Infrastructure 
Strongly frequented by traffic is the "B 500" (Bundesstraße 500) road which is also commonly known as the black forest "Panoramastraße". In 1972, the railway connection called Bregtalbahn was closed after 80 years of service. The railway track had led from Furtwangen to Donaueschingen.

Sons and daughters of the city 
 
 Hugo Eberhardt (1874-1959), architect
 Fritz Faiss (1905 – 1981), abstract expressionist artist
 Siegfried Weiss (1933-2013), cross-country skier

Personalities related to the city 
 Christabel Bielenberg (1909-2003), British writer
 Robert Gerwig (1825-1885), engineer, from 1850 to 1857 head of watchmaking school; one of the principal designers of the Black Forest Railway
 Alexander Herr (born 1978), ski jumper
 Georg Hettich (born 1978), Nordic combiner
 Dominik Koepfer (born 1994), professional tennis player
 Martin Schmitt (born 1978), popular ski jumper
 Thorsten Schmitt (born 1975), Nordic combiner

External links

Official website of the municipality(in German)
German Clock Museum
 Furtwangen: pictures & history (de)

Photo gallery

References

Black Forest
Schwarzwald-Baar-Kreis
Baden